Ann Marie McNamara is an American microbiologist is Vice President for Food Safety and Quality for the Supply Chain at US Foods. She has received a Distinguished Service Award from the United States Department of Agriculture, and received the International Association for Food Protection Fellow Award in 2012 and Food Safety Award in 2022.

Early life and education 
McNamara attended Quinnipiac University for undergraduate studies, where she coordinated the first screening program for Tay–Sachs disease at any university in the United States. She earned her M.S degree at the University of Minnesota, with a focus on microbiology. In Minnesota, she completed a research project on the detection of antibodies to La Crosse encephalitis virus. McNamara earned her doctoral degree in Infectious Diseases and Microbiology at University of Pittsburgh School of Public Health. Her research studied the detection and eradication of Legionella from hospital plumbing systems. After graduating, she joined the Centers for Disease Control and Prevention as a postdoctoral resident in Public Health and Medical Microbiology. Her postdoctoral research focused on medical microbiology and epidemiology.

Research and career 
McNamara was a Senior Staff Microbiologist at the National Institutes of Health Clinical Center for two years before moving to the United States Department of Agriculture as Director of Microbiology in 1992. At the time she joined the Food Safety and Inspection Service the majority of focus was on chemical adulterants. McNamara's primary focus was developing molecular (polymerase chain reaction) and immunological testing. She was a lead investigator at FSIS for the 1992-1993 Jack in the Box E. coli outbreak. She was a co-author of the Pathogen Reduction/Hazard Analysis and Critical Control Point (PR/HACCP) rule, which required scientifically verifiable methods to reduce the prevalence of pathogenic microorganisms in meat and poultry products.

McNamara joined Sara Lee Corporation in 1999, where she was responsible for food safety and the implementation of a listeria control project following a major Listeria outbreak. She established a food safety research fund at Georgetown University, and developed a program for Listeria control and environmental monitoring. She made use of her background in microbiology, testing food for pathogens and indicator organisms, and creating a risk-based testing program. McNamara worked as Vice President of Food Safety at Silliker, which later became Mérieux NutriSciences. At Silliker, she led the Research group doing process validation studies, and led the Consulting group conducting risk assessments, crisis management engagements and developing food safety plans.

In 2008, McNamara was made Vice President of Food Safety at Jack in the Box, where she oversaw all food safety and quality assurance. She joined Target Corporation in 2017 as their first Vice-President of Food Safety.

Awards and honors 
 2012 International Association for Food Protection Fellow Award
 2014 Food Safety Magazine Distinguished Service Award
 2018 International Association for Food Protection John H. Silliker Lecture
 2022 International Association for Food Protection Food Safety Award

Selected publications

References 

Living people
Quinnipiac University alumni
Women microbiologists
University of Minnesota alumni
University of Pittsburgh alumni
American microbiologists
Year of birth missing (living people)